Truskawiec may refer to:
Truskavets, Ukraine - Truskawiec in Polish
Truskawiec, Łódź Voivodeship (central Poland)